Shri Mahaveerji (SMVJ) is a railway station on the West Central railway network at Hindaun Tehsil in India. It comes under the Kota railway division of West Central Railway zone. This is a Grade-C station on the Delhi–Mumbai route. It serves Hindaun city. The station consists of three platforms. The station is about 7 Km away from Shri Mahaveer Ji temple.

Major trains 

 Indore–New Delhi Intercity Express
 Mewar Express
 Kota–Hazrat Nizamuddin Jan Shatabdi Express
 Agra Fort–Kota Passenger (unreserved)
 Hazrat Nizamuddin–Kota SF Special Fare Special
 Sawai Madhopur Mathura Passenger (unreserved)
 Mathura Sawai Madhopur Passenger (unreserved)
 Avadh Express
 Meerut City–Mandasor Link Express
 Parasnath SF Express
 Firozpur Janta Express
 Mathura Ratlam Passenger (unreserved)
 Haldighati Passenger
 Kota Agra Yamuna Bridge Passenger (unreserved)
 Golden Temple Mail
 Jaipur Bayana Fast Passenger (unreserved)

See also 
 Hindaun
 Hindaun City railway station
 Gangapur City railway station

References

Railway stations in Karauli district
Kota railway division